Schnait is a town district or Stadtteil within the town of Weinstadt ("Wine City") in Rems-Murr district, Baden-Württemberg, Germany.

Schnait was first mentioned in 1238 as Snait. It belonged to the Oberamt Schorndorf. In 1938 it became part of the district Waiblingen. Since 1973 Schnait belongs to the Rems-Murr-Kreis.

On January 1, 1975 the municipality of Schnait united with the then-independent municipalities of Beutelsbach, Endersbach, Strümpfelbach and Großheppach, to form the new municipality Weinstadt.

External links 

 Schnait at weinstadt.de

Villages in Baden-Württemberg
Rems-Murr-Kreis
Württemberg